The Indian locomotive class WCP-1 is a class of 1.5 kV DC electric locomotives that was developed in late 1920s by Swiss Locomotive and Machine Works (SLM)  for Indian Railways. The model name stands for broad gauge (W), Direct Current (C), Passenger traffic (P) engine, 1st generation (1). They entered service in 1930. A total of 22 WCP-1 was built at England between 1928 and 1929.

The WCP-1 served passenger trains for over 50 years. With the introduction of more modern types of locomotives and 25 KV AC electrification, all were withdrawn by early 1980s. Today one locomotive is preserved with the remainder of the units scrapped.

History 
The electrification of the Great Indian Peninsula Railway began in 1922. Powerful locomotives were required to transport the express trains on the mountain railway to overcome the Western Ghats. They also had to be able to reach speeds of 85 miles an hour (137 km / h) - a very high speed at that time, which was not even the case with the E 501 and 502 of the Paris-Orleans Railway had been requested. Three test locomotives were therefore ordered from different manufacturers in order to be able to select a suitable design for the series. The tender and evaluation was monitored by the UK electrical engineering firm Merz & McLellan in London.

The Great Indian Peninsula Railway ordered the following test locomotives in 1923:

Books

See also 
 Rail transport in India#History
 Indian Railways
 Locomotives of India
 Rail transport in India

References

External links
http://www.irfca.org/faq/faq-specs.html#WCP-1
Electric Locomotive Classes – AC, India railway fan club
India railway fan club

Electric locomotives of India
1500 V DC locomotives
Railway locomotives introduced in 1928
5 ft 6 in gauge locomotives
SLM locomotives